XLR-8 (pronounced "accelerate") was a suspended roller coaster located at the defunct Six Flags AstroWorld. Manufactured by Arrow Huss at a cost of $3.2 million, the ride opened to the public in 1984, where it operated until the park's closure in 2005. It was one of Arrow's first attempts at producing a successful suspended coaster following troubles with The Bat at Kings Island, which operated briefly from 1981 to 1983.

History

Car reversal
For AstroWorld's Fright Fest 2002 event, the last four cars on XLR-8's trains were reversed, a first for a suspended roller coaster. The change proved popular and successful, and the trains remained reversed until the park's closure in 2005.

Closure
In September 2005, it was announced that AstroWorld would not reopen for the 2006 season. XLR-8 closed along with the rest of the park on October 30, 2005, and was later demolished. A portion of the trains were sent to Six Flags Magic Mountain for use on Ninja.

See also
History of the roller coaster
Former Six Flag properties

References

Roller coasters operated by Six Flags
Former roller coasters in Texas
Six Flags AstroWorld